First Presbyterian Church and Manse is a historic Presbyterian church building and parsonage at 1160–1180 Cedar Street in Forsyth, Montana.  The property was listed on the National Register of Historic Places in 1990.

The church building was designed by architect Howard Van Doren Shaw in Prairie School style and was constructed in 1920.  It has also been known as Federated Church.  The manse was built in 1910 and is a second contributing building on the property.  A 1940-ish garage was deemed non-contributing.

References

Houses on the National Register of Historic Places in Montana
Churches on the National Register of Historic Places in Montana
Presbyterian churches in Montana
Prairie School architecture in Montana
Churches completed in 1920
Houses in Rosebud County, Montana
Howard Van Doren Shaw church buildings
National Register of Historic Places in Rosebud County, Montana
1910 establishments in Montana